Morgan Langley (born June 9, 1989) is a retired American soccer player who last played for St Patrick's Athletic.

Career

College and Amateur
Langley attended ʻIolani School, and played four years of college soccer at Swarthmore College. He is Swarthmore's all-time program leader in career points and assists. As a junior in 2009 he was named to the Centennial Conference first team, and was a NSCAA Mid-Atlantic All-Region second team selection, while as a senior in 2010 he was an NSCAA/NCAA All-American, an NSCAA Mideast All-Region selection, and was named to the Centennial Conference first team.

In his final season at Swarthmore, Langley produced one of the best offensive seasons in the school’s history, leading the team with 14 goals, 14 assists and a program single-season record 42 points.

Professional
Langley signed his first professional contract in 2011 when he signed with the Harrisburg City Islanders of the USL Professional Division. He made his professional debut on April 23 in a 1-0 loss to the Pittsburgh Riverhounds, and scored his first professional goal on May 31, in a 4-2 win, again against the Riverhounds.

After the end of the 2011 USL Pro season, Langley trialed with Philadelphia Union of Major League Soccer before signing with the MLS club on September 15, 2011. On January 19, 2012, Philadelphia declined his 2012 contract option and Langley was released.

Langley re-signed with his former club Harrisburg City Islanders on February 25, 2012. He stayed there until the end of the 2014 season.

Move to Europe
On March 10, 2015 Langley signed for Dublin based League of Ireland side, St Patrick's Athletic for the 2015 season, becoming the first American to sign for the club since Ryan Guy. He was given the number 8 jersey for the Saints, previously worn by former Ireland international Keith Fahey, who had controversially moved to Pats' main rivals Shamrock Rovers in pre-season. Langley made his Pats debut against Derry City at Richmond Park on the 24th March, coming on as a half time substitute and he scored a debut goal when he headed in a Conan Byrne free kick in the 82nd minute to secure a 2–0 win for the Saints.

In 2016, Langley announced his retirement from professional soccer.

Career statistics

Club
Competitive games only.

Honors
League of Ireland Cup (1): 2015

References

External links
 Harrisburg City Islanders bio
 Swarthmore profile

1989 births
Living people
American soccer players
Penn FC players
Philadelphia Union players
St Patrick's Athletic F.C. players
USL Championship players
Major League Soccer players
League of Ireland players
Expatriate association footballers in the Republic of Ireland
Soccer players from Hawaii
Swarthmore College alumni
Association football midfielders
Association football forwards